The Ambon white-eye (Zosterops kuehni) is a species of bird in the family Zosteropidae. It is endemic to Indonesia.

Its natural habitats are subtropical or tropical moist lowland forests, subtropical or tropical moist shrubland, and rural gardens. It is threatened by habitat loss.

References

Ambon white-eye
Birds of the Maluku Islands
Endemic fauna of Indonesia
Ambon white-eye
Taxonomy articles created by Polbot